Avicii Arena, originally known as Stockholm Globe Arena and previously as Ericsson Globe, but commonly referred to in Swedish simply as Globen ("the Globe"), is an indoor arena located in Stockholm Globe City, Johanneshov district of Stockholm, Sweden.

The arena represents the Sun in the Sweden Solar System, the world's largest scale model of the Solar System.

Construction

Avicii Arena is the largest spherical building on Earth and took two and a half years to build. In the upper area there are 40 VIP boxes and a restaurant.

The steel, concrete and glass construction designed by the architects Berg Arkitektkontor AB is supported by a MERO space structure. It represents the Sun in the Sweden Solar System, the world's largest scale model of the Solar System.

History

Globen was inaugurated on 19 February 1989 after a construction period of less than three years. 
The first major events were Melodifestivalen, the Ice Hockey World Championships and the Men's European Volleyball Chamiponships.

In 2009, the naming rights to the Stockholm Globe Arena were officially acquired by Swedish telecommunications company Ericsson, and it became known as the Ericsson Globe.

In 2021, it was announced that the arena would be renamed the Avicii Arena in honour of the late Swedish DJ Avicii, who died in 2018. To commemorate the new name, the Royal Stockholm Philharmonic Orchestra recorded a performance of the Avicii song "For a Better Day", with vocals provided by fourteen-year-old Swedish singer Ella Tiritiello.

In June 2022, it was decided to renovate and modernize the arena throughtout 2024 - also with a view to hosting the 2025 IIHF World Championship, which is to be jointly held in Sweden and Denmark. After the scheduled reopening at the start of 2025, the neighboring Hovet arena is to be demolished and the site is to become part of the new district Soderhov.

Events

The Globe is primarily used for ice hockey, and is the former home arena of AIK, Djurgårdens IF, and Hammarby IF. It is also used for musical performances as well as other sports than ice hockey, for example futsal (indoor football). The third team to play a home game in their league was Huddinge IK (three home games there, all in 1993), followed by Hammarby IF (20 home games in The Globen to this day) and AC Camelen (one game in 1998, in the sixth level league, with 92 spectators).

The first international game played in Globen was between Hammarby IF (Sweden) and Jokerit (Finland) a couple of weeks before the grand opening, although the players were only 12 years old at the time (born 1977) and it was a friendly game.

The arena has been the home of the finals of Sveriges Television's yearly music competition Melodifestivalen until 2012. The show returns to the arena for the first three heats of the 2022 competition. Ericsson Globe hosted the Eurovision Song Contest in 2000 and 2016.

In March 2021, it hosted the World Figure Skating Championships despite the ongoing COVID-19 pandemic. In November 2021, it hosted the Counter-Strike: Global Offensive tournament Major Stockholm 2021.

Concerts

Artwork 

A small cottage in aluminum with a  base was placed upon the Globe on 26 May 2009. The artist, Mikael Genberg, intended it to illustrate two important symbols for Sweden: the high-technology Globe building and the traditional, simple small countryside cottage in Falu red with house corners painted in white. The house was positioned some distance from the exact top position of the Globe. Genberg also hoped to eventually place a similar cottage on the Moon. The cottage remained on the Globe until October 2009.

Skyview

Skyview is an exterior inclined elevator which transports visitors to the top of the arena for a virtually unobstructed view of Stockholm.

It has two spherical gondolas, each able to accommodate up to 12 passengers, which travel along parallel tracks on the exterior of the south side of the globe.

Skyview opened in February 2010 and carried 160,000 people during its first year of operation.

See also 
Architecture of Stockholm
Hovet
Tele2 Arena
MSG Sphere London
MSG Sphere at The Venetian
List of indoor arenas in Nordic countries
List of European ice hockey arenas

References

External links 

Stockholm Globe Arenas, website. (English).
Stockholm Globe City 
Hockeyarenas.net entry
Web cams monitoring the construction on the Globe Arena

Event venues established in 1989
Sports venues in Stockholm
Globen
Indoor arenas in Sweden
Indoor ice hockey venues in Sweden
Domes
Ice hockey in Stockholm
Ice hockey venues in Sweden
Sweden
Handball venues in Sweden
Athletics (track and field) venues in Sweden
Indoor track and field venues
1989 establishments in Sweden
Avicii